Florence Hurd (6 May 1913 – May 1988) was a Canadian speed skater. She lived in or near Copper Cliff, Ontario, Canada.

She competed in all the three women's speed skating events at the 1932 Winter Olympics in Lake Placid, United States, which were held as demonstration sport. She competed in the 500 metres event, 1000 metres event and 1500 metres event but was eliminated in the heats.

In 1935, she was the North American Indoor Champion.

Hurd stated on 8 January 1936 that she will not compete at the 1936 World Allround Speed Skating Championships for women in Oslo, Norway; the first official World Allround Speed Skating Championships for Women.

After the Stanley Stadium in Copper Cliff was built, the region's first artificial ice surface, Hurd moved to the region together with her brother to train there.

Personal life
She had a brother, Alex Hurd, who was also a speed skater. Several family members living in Eastern Ontario, Ottawa, and Niagara Falls, are described in a 1948 local newspaper.

References

External links

Canadian female speed skaters
Olympic speed skaters of Canada
Speed skaters at the 1932 Winter Olympics
1913 births
People from North Sydney, Nova Scotia
Sportspeople from the Cape Breton Regional Municipality
Date of death missing
1988 deaths
20th-century Canadian women